This is a list of North Carolina Central Eagles football players in the NFL Draft.

Key

Selections

References

North Carolina Central

North Carolina Central Eagles NFL Draft